The 2022–23 CAF Confederation Cup knockout stage will start on 23 April with the quarter-finals and end on 11 June 2023 with the finals to decide the champions of the 2022–23 CAF Confederation Cup. A total of eight teams will compete in the knockout stage.

Times are local.

Round and draw dates
The schedule will be as follows.

Format
Each tie in the knockout phase will be played over two legs, with each team playing one leg at home. The team that will score more goals on aggregate over the two legs will advance to the next round. If the aggregate score will be level, the away goals rule will be applied, i.e. the team that will score more goals away from home over the two legs will advance. If away goals will be also equal, then extra time will be not played and the winners will be decided by a penalty shoot-out (Regulations III. 26 & 27).

The mechanism of the draws for each round will be as follows:
In the draw for the quarter-finals, the four group winners will be seeded, and the four group runners-up will be unseeded. The seeded teams will be drawn against the unseeded teams, with the seeded teams hosting the second leg. Teams from the same group could not be drawn against each other, while teams from the same association can be drawn against each other.
In the draws for semi-finals, there will be no seedings, and teams from the same group or the same association could be drawn against each other. As the draws for the quarter-finals and semi-finals will be held together before the quarter-finals will be played, the identity of the quarter-final winners will not be known at the time of the semi-final draw.

Qualified teams
The knockout stage will involve the 8 teams which qualify as winners and runners-up of each of the eight groups in the group stage.

Bracket
The bracket of the knockout stage will be determined as follows:

The bracket will be decided after the draw for the knockout stage (quarter-finals and semi-finals), which will be held in April 2023, at the CAF headquarters in Cairo, Egypt.

Quarter-finals
The draw for the quarter-finals will be held in April 2023.

Summary
The first legs will be played on 23 April, and the second legs will be played on 30 April 2023.

Semi-finals
The draw for the semi-finals will be held in April 2023 (after the quarter-finals draw).

Summary
The first legs will be played on 14 May, and the second legs will be played on 21 May 2023.

Finals

The first leg will be played on 4 June, and the second leg will be played on 11 June 2023.

Notes

References

External links
CAFonline.com

May 2023 sports events in Africa
2022–23 CAF Confederation Cup
April 2023 sports events in Africa